Aldora Itunu (born 28 June 1991) is a rugby union player from New Zealand. She made her debut for the Black Ferns in 2015 and was selected for the 2017 Women's Rugby World Cup squad. In the highest level of New Zealand domestic women's rugby competition, Itunu plays for the Auckland Storm as does her sister Linda Itunu. She spent a season playing in England and has also played in Italy.

Itunu played for the Blues against the Chiefs in the first-ever women's Super Rugby match in New Zealand on 1 May 2021. On 3 November 2021, she was named in the Blues squad for the inaugural Super Rugby Aupiki competition.

Itunu was named in the Blues starting line up for their first game against Matatū, they won 21–10. She also started in their 0–35 thrashing by the Chiefs Manawa in the final round.

References

External links
 Aldora Itunu at Black Ferns

1991 births
Living people
New Zealand women's international rugby union players
New Zealand female rugby union players